Buccleuch Parish, commonly known as the South Side is a district in south Edinburgh built as an expansion to the Old Town in the 18th century. The area lies between the Old Town and Newington.

Background
Changes on the need to live within the town wall of Edinburgh, in order to trade, were lifted in 1752 in order to permit the building of the New Town to the north of the established city, however, this had the side effect of also allowing expansion on the south side of the city. Unlike the north, where streets were formally planned, on the south this happened on an ad hoc basis, centred on existing roads leading out of the city to neighbouring towns such as Dalkeith and Peebles. There were already a small number of small rural properties along these routes. Redevelopment was on a taller and more continuous urban street pattern, quickly transforming the character of the area.

This likely expansion was quickly recognised by the Church of Scotland and as early as 1754 the parish of Buccleuch was created as a quoad sacra church linked to St Cuthbert's Church which represented the outer districts of the city. Whilst the church was formally a "chapel of ease" - reducing the burden on the main church - the distance to St Cuthbert's was such that a new church was easily justified. What is somewhat odd, is that the church was built largely pre-emptively, rather than in reaction to a growing population (as was the norm).

The church was built 1755-6 in advance of most of the redevelopment, but was not flamboyant in any way, and took the form of a simple box chapel. Although there was plenty of empty ground around, it limited its graveyard to a small parcel of land, avoiding the need to acquire land from third parties. The graveyard was quickly filled and had to be supplemented by the creation of East Preston Street Burial Ground in 1820.

Street pattern

In general the street form is based on gently winding streets running north to south, with more regular and formalised streets running east-west between the older routes.

Older groups, such as Boroughloch Square, existed to the west, where expansion was generally limited by the pre-existing common lands on the Meadows. On the east side expansion was limited by the Holyrood Park.

The first (or arguably only) formal section is George Square which dates from 1766.

To its immediate south stands Buccleuch Place, a wide Georgian cul-de-sac dating from 1779. Its somewhat austere exterior belies its internal beauty and its status at the time of construction, being home to many lords and ladies.

Two other "squares" bound the west side of the main north/south road: Nicolson Square, which has no formal masterplan, and St Patrick Square, which has a formal composition on two sides. Hill Square to the east hides from public view, but is a small and pleasant Georgian square.

Two periods of "slum clearance" have changed the original pattern: the City Architect (E J MacRae) created stone-built semi-traditional blocks north of East Richmond Street; and the city demolished the dense tenements in Dumbiedykes and St Leonards in the early 1960s, replacing them with non-traditional forms.

Buildings of note
Hermits and Termits, St Leonards (1734) once an isolated country house
Pear Tree House (c.1750) now used as a public house
Buccleuch Parish Church (1756) recently reconsecrated as a church for the Greek Orthodox Church
Archers' Hall (1777)
Nicolson Street Church (1820) by James Gillespie Graham now used as Southside Community Centre
Queen's Hall (1823) by Robert Brown (Scottish architect)
Surgeon's Hall (1832) by William Henry Playfair
Buccleuch Greyfriars Free Church (1856) whose spectacular stone spire dominates the area
Summerhall, home to Royal Dick Veterinary College (1909 onwards) now in entertainment use
Edinburgh Central Mosque (1998)

Notable residents

Very Rev Charles Brown - 15 Buccleuch Place
Rev Patrick Clason - 23 Buccleuch Place
Very Rev William Henry Goold - 28 Buccleuch Place
Richard Huie - 16 Nicolson Street
James Jamieson (dentist) - 52 Rankeillor Street
Francis Jeffrey - 18 Buccleuch Place
Josiah Livingston -26 Buccleuch Place and later 1 Buccleuch Place
John Paterson (architect) - 24 Buccleuch Place

References

Areas of Edinburgh